Pristiglomidae is a family of small saltwater clams, marine bivalve molluscs in the order Nuculida.

Genus and species
 Pristigloma Dall, 1900
 Pristigloma alba Sanders & Allen, 1973 
 Pristigloma minima (G. Seguenza, 1877)
 Pristigloma nitens (Jeffreys, 1876)

References

 
 Bieler R. & Mikkelsen P. 2006. Bivalvia – a look at the Branches. Zoological Journal of the Linnean Society, 148, 223–235

 
Bivalve families